William Craven, 2nd Baron Craven (24 October 1668 – 9 October 1711) was an English nobleman.

He was born in the old house at Benham Park at Speen in Berkshire, the son of Sir William Craven, a grandson of a cousin of William Craven, 1st Earl of Craven. He was appointed Lord Lieutenant of Berkshire in 1702, a position he held until his death in 1711. His main residence was Coombe Abbey, near Coventry in Warwickshire.

References

1668 births
1711 deaths
Lord-Lieutenants of Berkshire
People from Speen, Berkshire
People from Coventry
William
2